Sakura Pascarelli is an Italian physicist and the scientific director at the European XFEL. Her research focuses on the study on matter at extreme conditions of pressure, temperature and magnetic fields, in particular using X-ray absorption spectroscopy (XAS) and X-ray Magnetic Linear and  Circular Dichroism (XMCD).

Early life and education  

Pascarelli was born in Japan. She received a Laurea in Physics from La Sapienza (Rome, Italy) and a PhD degree in Physics at the Joseph Fourier University (Grenoble, France). She is an accomplished swimmer.

Research and career 

Pascarelli was the head of the Matter at Extremes Group within the Experiment Division of the European Synchrotron Radiation Facility in Grenoble, France, and in charge of the X-ray absorption spectroscopy beamlines. She joined the European XFEL in Hamburg, Germany, as scientific director.

Pascarelli is a member of the scientific advisory committee of SLAC's Stanford Synchrotron Radiation Lightsource.

References

External links 

 
 
 

Italian women physicists
Condensed matter physicists
Sapienza University of Rome alumni
Living people
Year of birth missing (living people)